Lucas Rios Marques (born 26 March 1988), sometimes known as just Lucas, is a Brazilian footballer who plays as a right back.

Career 
Born in Passos, Minas Gerais, Lucas Marques made professional debut for Figueirense against Palmeiras in a 1–2 away defeat on 20 May 2007 in Campeonato Brasiliense. On 29 December 2010, he signed a five-year contract with Botafogo.

On 20 September 2012, Lucas Marques debut for Seleção in the victory against Argentines for 2–1, at Estádio Serra Dourada, in Goiânia, by Superclásico de las Américas.

Palmeiras
On 16 December 2014, the right-back signed a three-year contract with Palmeiras.

In March 2019, he joined Botafogo-SP on loan.

Games for Brazilian team

Honours

Club
Botafogo
Campeonato Carioca: 2013
Taça Rio: 2012, 2013 
Taça Guanabara: 2013

Palmeiras
Copa do Brasil: 2015

 Fluminense
Taça Guanabara: 2017

Brazil
Superclásico de las Américas: 2012

Individual
 Campeonato Carioca Team of the year: 2017

References

External links 

1988 births
Living people
Sportspeople from Minas Gerais
Brazilian footballers
Association football defenders
Campeonato Brasileiro Série A players
Campeonato Brasileiro Série B players
Figueirense FC players
Botafogo de Futebol e Regatas players
Sociedade Esportiva Palmeiras players
Cruzeiro Esporte Clube players
Fluminense FC players
Esporte Clube Vitória players
Botafogo Futebol Clube (SP) players
Brazil under-20 international footballers
Brazil international footballers